The Longton, Adderley Green & Bucknall railway was a railway line in North Staffordshire that operated between 1875 and 1964. The line was the idea of the identically named Longton, Adderley Green & Bucknall railway company (L AG & B) which was granted parliamentary approval in 1866 to build a  goods only line from Botteslow Junction on the NSR's Biddulph Valley line. The L AG & B did not construct the line but leased all construction and operation to the NSR.

Construction was not fast and it was nine years after approval before the line opened in September 1875. Two time extensions were required before completion and the plans were altered to provide a second junction with the NSR at Millfield Junction, near  on the Crewe–Derby line.

In 1894 the NSR purchased the L AG & B company to take ownership of the line and on 1 January 1895, the NSR severed the line near Weston Coyney to increase the distance that coal had to be carried on the company's lines therefore increasing revenue.  The line remained split until closure in the 1960s when the  branch from Millfield Junction closed at the end of December 1963. The longer  branch from Botteslow Junction closed the following year.

References

Sources
 
 

Railway lines opened in 1875
North Staffordshire Railway
Closed railway lines in the West Midlands (region)
Railway lines closed in 1963
Railway lines closed in 1964